Micree Zhan or Zhan Ketuan (born 29 January 1979) is a Chinese electronics engineer and businessman. He is the co-founder and CEO  (with Wu Jihan) of Bitmain, the world's largest computer chip company for cryptocurrency mining. In 2018, Hurun Report named him the richest cryptocurrency billionaire in the world. In 2019, Bloomberg ranked Zhan as the world's 9th richest self-made billionaire aged 40 or younger, with a net worth of US$5.2 billion.

Early life and education
Zhan Ketuan was born on 29 January 1979 in Minhou County, Fujian, China.

After graduating from Minhou No. 1 High School, he entered Shandong University, where he earned a bachelor's degree in electronics engineering in 2001. He then earned his master's degree in microelectronics engineering from the Institute of Microelectronics, Chinese Academy of Sciences in 2004.

Career
After earning his master's degree, Zhan worked as an engineer at the Information Technology Research Institute at Tsinghua University. He later started his own business making set-top boxes for television.

In 2013, Zhan met up with Wu Jihan, an enthusiast for cryptocurrency. After hours of discussion and research, Zhan agreed to start Bitmain with Wu. The company quickly grew into the world's largest computer chip company for bitcoin mining, reporting US$2.5 billion in revenue in 2017. As of 2018, Zhan owns 36% of Bitmain, and Wu 20%.

In Hurun Report's inaugural Blockchain Rich List 2018, Zhan was named the richest cryptocurrency entrepreneur in the world, with an estimated net worth of 29.5 billion yuan (US$4.3 billion), while Wu was ranked second. In February 2019, Bloomberg ranked Zhan as the world's 9th richest self-made billionaire aged 40 or younger, with a net worth of US$5.2 billion. As of June 2019, he is listed as the world's 311th richest person in the Bloomberg Billionaires Index, with $5.42 billion.

Personal life 
As of 2019, Zhan is single and has no children. He lives in Beijing.

References

1979 births
Living people
21st-century Chinese businesspeople
Billionaires from Fujian
Businesspeople from Fuzhou
Chinese chief executives
Chinese electronics engineers
Chinese technology company founders
Engineers from Fujian
People associated with Bitcoin
Shandong University alumni
Academic staff of Tsinghua University